|}

The Preis von Europa is a Group 1 flat horse race in Germany open to thoroughbreds aged three years or older. It is run at Cologne over a distance of 2,400 metres (about 1½ miles), and it is scheduled to take place each year in September.

History
The event was established in 1963, a year after the discontinuation of the Gladiatoren-Rennen at Krefeld. Its predecessor was contested over 2,800 metres, and the last running was won by a horse called Opponent. The same horse won the inaugural edition of the Preis von Europa, run over 2,400 metres at Cologne.

The present system of race grading was introduced in Germany in 1972, and the Preis von Europa was classed at the highest level, Group 1.

The race has been sponsored by several different companies since the 1980s, including Puma, Deutsche Post and IVG.

Records
Most successful horse (3 wins):
 Anilin – 1965, 1966, 1967

Leading jockey (4 wins):

 Andrasch Starke - Schiaparelli (2007), Girolamo (2012), Nightflower (2015, 2016)

Leading trainer (7 wins):
 Heinz Jentzsch – Lombard (1971), Days at Sea (1974), Ebano (1977), Ataxerxes (1982), Monsun (1993, 1994), Solon (1995)

Leading owner (4 wins):
 Voskhod Stud – Anilin (1965, 1966, 1967), Aden (1978)

Winners

See also
 List of German flat horse races

References
 Racing Post:

 galopp-sieger.de – Preis von Europa.
 horseracingintfed.com – International Federation of Horseracing Authorities – Preis von Europa (2018).
 pedigreequery.com – Preis von Europa – Köln.
 tbheritage.com – Preis von Europa.

Open middle distance horse races
Horse races in Germany
Recurring sporting events established in 1963
Sport in Cologne
1963 establishments in West Germany